The Universidad Católica de Honduras, officially named "Universidad Católica de Honduras Nuestra Señora Reina de la Paz" (Catholic University of Honduras Our Lady Queen of Peace), or "UNICAH" as it is affectionately called among its students, is a private university in Honduras run by the Catholic Church. It has 11 campuses in various cities, in the country such as:

 Campus San José, Tegucigalpa
 Campus Sagrado Corazón de Jesús, Comayaguela
 Campus San Pedro y San Pablo, San Pedro Sula
 Campus San Isidro, La Ceiba
 Campus Santa Clara, Juticalpa
 Campus Dios Espíritu Santo, Choluteca
 Campus Jesús Sacramentado, Siguatepeque
 Campus Santa Rosa de Lima, Santa Rosa de Copán
 Campus Santiago Apóstol, Danli, El Paraíso
 Campus San Jorge, Olanchito, Yoro
 Campus Espiritualidad El Tabor, Valle de Ángeles

External links

 Official Website

Universities in Honduras
Catholic universities and colleges in Honduras